James Gibson (November 19, 1849 – December 12, 1918) was a lawyer, judge and politician. He served as Mayor of Kansas City, Missouri in 1883.

Early life
James Gibson was born on November 19, 1849, in Cooper County, Missouri to John Gibson. Gibson was descended from John Bannister Gibson and Edward Rutledge. He attended Kemper Military School in Boonville.

Career
In 1871, Gibson moved to Kansas City, Missouri. In 1877, Gibson was elected as city attorney of Kansas City and he was re-elected in 1878. In 1880, Gibson served as a presidential elector. In 1883, Gibson was elected as Mayor of Kansas City. Gibson was a Democrat.

Gibson was a member of the Jackson County Circuit Court from 1889 to 1904.

Personal life
Gibson married Mary Todd Pence of Weston, Missouri, on November 18, 1880. They had one son and one daughter, James E. Gibson and Mrs. Burris McGie Little. His son was the general manager of the Kansas City Railways Company.

Gibson died on December 12, 1918, at his home on 2934 Tracy Avenue in Kansas City. He was buried at Mount Washington Cemetery in Independence, Missouri.

References

External links

1849 births
1918 deaths
People from Cooper County, Missouri
Mayors of Kansas City, Missouri
Missouri lawyers
Missouri Democrats